Nizhny Keger is a rural locality (a selo) in Kegersky Selsoviet, Gunibsky District, Republic of Dagestan, Russia. The population was 208 as of 2010.

Geography 
Nizhny Keger is located 6 km northeast of Gunib (the district's administrative centre) by road. Khindakh and Khotoch are the nearest rural localities.

References 

Rural localities in Gunibsky District